Siege of Tarr-Hostigos by John F. Carr, 2003, is the fourth book in the Kalvan series.

Characters

Returning Characters
 Great King Kalvan
 Queen Rylla
 Prince Ptosphes
 Prince Sarrask
 Prince Balthames
 Prince Phrames
 General Harmakros
 Highpriest Xentos
 Alkides
 Aspasthar
 Princess Demia
 Grand Master Soton
 Knight Commander Aristocles
 Captain-General Phidestros
 Supreme Priest Sesklos
 Archpriest Anaxthenes
 Archpriest Dracar
 Archpriest Roxthar
 Archpriest Cimon
 Great King Demistophon

References
 John F. Carr, Siege of Tarr-Hostigos, Pequod Press, 2003

Kalvan series
Novels by John F. Carr